Eitr is a term for atter, or poison, in Old Norse. In Nordic mythology, it is the origin of the first jötunn, Ymir, who was conceived from eitr dripped from the icy rivers called the Élivágar. Eitr is also produced by poisonous snakes such as the worm Jörmungandr.

Etymology

Role in cosmogony
In Gylfaginning,  is described as forming in Ginnungagap, which gave rise to the primordial being Ymir, as described by the jötunn Vafþrúðnir in Vafþrúðnismál:

Production by snakes
 is described as being produced by snakes such as in Gylfaginning when it is dripped on Loki by a snake placed above him by Skaði, and blown by Jörmungandr during Ragnarök, leading to the death of Thor.

Citations

Bibliography

Primary

Secondary

External links
 Snorra-Edda: Gylfaginning

Artifacts in Norse mythology
Mythological substances
Origin myths
Ymir